Preuilly-sur-Claise is a commune in the Indre-et-Loire department in central France.

Situation
Preuilly-sur-Claise is situated at the extreme south of the Touraine at crossroad of Berry (Indre) and Poitou (Vienne) on the Claise river. The village lies 24 km from Descartes, 30 km from Le Blanc, 34 km from Châtellerault and 35 km from Loches. The largest city in Indre et Loire is Tours, and the other biggest one outside the department is Poitiers (Poitou)

History
In 1814, Preuilly-sur-Claise annexed the commune of Saint-Michel-du-Bois.

Preuilly Abbey, a Benedictine monastery, was founded here in the year 1001. It was suppressed in 1791 during the French Revolution, but the Romanesque abbey church dedicated to Saint Peter has survived.

Education
A kindergarten, a grade school and a secondary school (Collège Gaston Defferre) (Public) and another private secondary school (Collège Notre-Dame)

Sport
A football stadium, two tennis courts, a basketball court, minigolf site and a Pétanque ground are situated near the river. The camping site is near the swimming pool and a green area with a pond and games for children. A gymnasium with a climbing wall permit diverse sports practising like badminton, basketball, handball, football, tennis, ping pong. Community youth center welcomed diverse activities like dance, gymnastics, yoga, body building.

Racing cyclist Léon Georget — "The Father of the Bol d'Or" — was born in Preuilly-sur-Claise.

Transport
Direct bus from/to Tours (G line) 2 times per day for less than €2.(about an hour and a half from Preuilly to the Tours'station), Bus to Loches too (LMA line)

Activities
Children's outdoor activity centre is opened for children from 3 to 16 years old on Easter Holidays and summer holidays.

Health
Doctor, dentists, chemists, optician, speech therapist, staff nurse, veterinarian.

Population

See also
Communes of the Indre-et-Loire department

References

Communes of Indre-et-Loire
Touraine